Mary Reed may refer to:
 Mary Reed (missionary) (1854–1943), American missionary to India
 Mary Reed (writer), co-writer of the John, the Lord Chamberlain series of historical mystery novels
 Mary Lou Reed (born 1930), American politician and environmentalist
 Mary Lynn Reed (born 1967), American mathematician, intelligence researcher, and short fiction writer

See also
Mary Read, pirate